FlexEnable is a technology provider that develops flexible organic electronics technologies and OTFT materials (branded as FlexiOM™). The company is located on the Cambridge Science Park, just north of Cambridge city centre.  

FlexEnable was spun-out of Cambridge University with a focus on replacing silicon on glass in large-area electronics with organic thin-film transistors (OTFTs) on flexible substrates, enabling optoelectronic modules which are flexible, ultra-thin, ultra-light and unbreakable. FlexEnable is bringing organic electronics technology to market in a fabless business model. It supplies OTFT materials, technology transfers, and process licenses to display manufacturers allowing them to upgrade and diversify using existing production assets and tap into exciting new markets. 
.

Technology 

FlexEnable's maximum processing temperature for organic thin-film transistors is below 100 °C. This low temperature allows for the use of lower-cost plastic substrates enabling low cost, high yield mount and demount approach to handling flexible substrates .

FlexEnable also state  that their transistors are the most flexible – and can be bent to a radius of 0.25mm thousands of times without affecting performance.

Applications for FlexEnable’s technology include flexible Organic LCD displays (OLCD) for consumer electronics and automotive, and flexible biaxially formable active Liquid Crystal Cell (LC Optics) that actively modulate, steer and focus light for applications including AR/VR optics and smart glasses, automotive smart windows and switchable ePrivacy displays.

See also 
 Electronic paper
 Waveshare Electronics

External links
 FlexEnable Flexible Display.

References

Companies based in Cambridge
Technology companies of England
Organic electronics
Flexible displays
Flexible electronics